Samuel Charles Wilks (1789–1872) was an evangelical clergyman of the Church of England, known as a journalist.

Life
He was son of Samuel Wilks of Newington, Surrey, and was educated for the church. He matriculated at St Edmund Hall, Oxford, on 8 June 1810, aged 21, and graduated B.A. in 1814 and M.A. in 1816.

Wilks took holy orders, being ordained deacon in 1813, and priest in 1814, by Richard Beadon. He was curate at Norton Malreward,
Chew Stoke and Exeter St Martin. He attached himself to the Clapham sect, and in 1816 succeeded Zachary Macaulay as editor of the Christian Observer, the organ of the sect. Charles Simeon was a friend.

Wilks continued to edit the Christian Observer until 1850, when he was succeeded by John William Cunningham, and resided at the living of Nursling, near Southampton, to which he had been presented in 1847. He died there on 23 December 1872, in his eighty-fourth year, leaving several children.

Works
While an undergraduate Wilks won in 1813 the premium of the Society for Promoting Christian Knowledge for an Essay on the Signs of Conversion and Unconversion in Ministers of the Church, which was published in 1814, and reached a third edition in 1830. In 1817 he dedicated to Hannah More two volumes of Christian Essays (London).

In 1835 Wilks published a new edition of Lord Teignmouth's Memoirs of Sir William Jones, with a life of Teignmouth. He was the author of tracts, essays, and letters on religious matters, mostly reprinted from the Christian Observer; he also supported, against prevalent religious opinion, many of the innovative views propounded by geologists.

Family
Wilks married in 1818 Rebecca Emma Langstone Earle, daughter of Joseph Earle. Their children included the surgeon Alfred Garratt Platt Wilks.

References

External links
Online Books page

Attribution

1789 births
1872 deaths
18th-century English people
19th-century English Anglican priests
English male journalists